The  is a Japanese Shinkansen high-speed train type on order for Tsubasa services announced on March 3, 2020. It is designed by Ken Okuyama, in cooperation with Kawasaki Heavy Industries.

The train type is scheduled to enter service in early-mid 2024. Though 17 sets were originally planned to be built, this was reduced to 15 sets due to reduced travel demand caused by the COVID-19 pandemic. These sets are to be built by Kawasaki Railcar Manufacturing and Hitachi.

The first train was delivered to the Sendai depot on January 30, 2023.

Design
The train was designed to invoke the richness of the landscape of the Yamagata region, and the "weaving together of nature and people". The exterior coloring is unchanged from the re-liveried E3 series, also designed by Ken Okuyama: white, evoking the snow of Mount Zaō; deep purple inspired by the Mandarin duck, the prefectural bird for Yamagata Prefecture; and yellow and red for the safflower, the prefectural flower of Yamagata Prefecture.

All cars are equipped with full active suspension.

Formation
The E8 uses the same 5M2T-formation as the E3 and E6 series mini-shinkansen, meaning that it consists of 5 powered (motor), and 2 non-powered (trailer) cars.

 Cars 12 and 16 are equipped with single-arm pantographs.

Interior
The 7-car trains have two service classes: ordinary cars and Green cars, with a seating capacity of 355. This is 39 fewer seats than the E3 series trains it replaces. Both seating configurations are 2+2 abreast, as is the case for all other Shinkansen trains. AC power outlets are available in both classes. Both the cabins and vestibules are equipped with security cameras. The green car has room for one wheelchair user, while each ordinary car has room for two. All seven cars are equipped to handle large baggage.

The color scheme of the Green car seating is inspired by the blue waters of the Mogami River, combined with the lush greenery covering Mount Gassan. The ordinary car seating draws inspiration from the traditional process of extracting the color of the safflower, which is why the color gradually becomes less saturated moving from the seat cushion to the headrest. The center aisle carpet was designed based on the image of the safflower, represented by the seats, reflecting on the waters of the Mogami River as it flows between them.

See also
 List of high-speed trains

References

External links
 Press release (in Japanese)

Shinkansen train series
East Japan Railway Company

Passenger trains running at least at 300 km/h in commercial operations
Upcoming products
Kawasaki multiple units
Hitachi multiple units